Segaon, Madhya Pradesh is a village & Tehsil in Khargone district in the Indian state of Madhya Pradesh.

Geography
It is a  Tehsil of Khargone district.
Segaon is generally famous for the temple shri lalbai phoolbai mata mandir. Segaon is a very old town. Ram mandir gali is situated in the middle of this town.

References

External links
 Khargone District

Khargone district
Villages in Khargone district